The Airlie Red Flesh, (also known as the Hidden Rose or the Mountain Rose), is a cultivar of domesticated apple.

Overview
Airlie Red Flesh fruits are medium-sized, often small. The flavour of an Airlie Red Flesh apple has a balance of sweetness and tartness. The Airlie Red Flesh apple has dark red flesh and a crisp texture. The Airlie Red Flesh apple tends to ripen in late September.

References

American apples
Apple cultivars